is a passenger railway station located in the city of Hachiōji, Tokyo, Japan, operated by the East Japan Railway Company (JR East).

Lines

Station layout
The station consists of two elevated opposed side platforms serving two tracks, with the station building located underneath. The station is attended.

Platforms

History
The station opened on 28 December 1957. A new station building with elevated tracks was completed in March 1988, coinciding with the doubling of the Yokohama line between Hachiōji and Aihara.

Station numbering was introduced on 20 August 2016 with Katakura being assigned station number JH31.

Passenger statistics
In fiscal 2019, the station was used by an average of 5,212 passengers daily (boarding passengers only).

The passenger figures (boarding passengers only) for previous years are as shown below.

Surrounding area
Hachioji City Yui Civic Center
 Hachioji Katakura Post Office
Fujitanido Park

See also
 List of railway stations in Japan

References

External links

 JR East station information 

Railway stations in Japan opened in 1957
Railway stations in Tokyo
Yokohama Line
Stations of East Japan Railway Company
Hachiōji, Tokyo